Ourcq is a station in the 19th arrondissement of Paris, served by line 5 of the Paris Métro. It is named after the nearby rue de l'Ourcq, which in turn was named after the river Ourcq, a tributary of the Marne (river). It rises in Aisne and flows into Île-de-France. It is connected to the Seine via the Canal de l'Ourcq.

History
The station opened on 12 October 1942 with the commissioning of the extension of line 5 from Gare du Nord to Eglise de Pantin. It was then located not far from Belleville-Villette station on the Chemin de fer de Petite Ceinture line which closed in 1934. A bridge the line used to run on still exists on avenue Jean-Jaurès around 200 m away from the station.

On 9 October 2019, some of the nameplates on the station's platforms were temporarily replaced by the RATP to celebrate the 60th anniversary of the popular comic series Asterix and Obelix along with eleven other stations. It used the characteristic typography of the comic strips by  René Goscinny and Albert Uderzo, its creators. It was humorously renamed "AbraracOurcqcix", a reference to one of the characters in the comics, Abraracourcix, the chief of the village where Asterix and Obelix belongs.

In 2019, the station was used by 3,763,663 passengers, making it the 131th busiest of the Métro network out of 302 stations.

In 2020, the station was used by 2,064,168 passengers amidst the COVID-19 pandemic, making it the 118th busiest of the Métro network out of 305 stations.

In 2021, the station was used by 2,862,337 passengers, making it the 116th busiest of the Métro network out of 305 stations.

Passenger services

Access
The station has three accesses:
 Access 1: rue de Lunéville
 Access 2: rue de l'Ourcq
 Access 3: rue Adolphe Mille

Station layout

Platform

Ourcq has a standard platform configuration: it has two platforms separated by metro tracks and an elliptical roof. It is decorated in the Ouï-dire style in red. The lighting strips are supported by curved shaped fake consoles. The direct lighting is white while the indirect lighting, projected on the vault, is multi-coloured. The white ceramic tiles are flat and cover the walls, the roof, and the outlets. The advertising frames are red and cylindrical, and the name of the station is written with the Parisine typeface on enamelled plates. The platforms are equipped with red Motte-style seats and grey "sit-lean" benches.

Since the late 1980s, the station features a Thierry Grave sculpture exhibit made of limewood in a niche on the walls of the platform towards Bobigny-Pablo Picasso. It represents the joint of a fabled animal.

Other connections
The station is also served by lines 60 and 71 of the RATP Bus Network, and at night, by lines N13, N41, and N45 of the Noctilien network.

Nearby 

 Canal de l'Ourcq
 Cimetière de la Villette
 Darse du fond de Rouvray
 Pont levant de la rue de Crimée

Gallery

References

Paris Métro stations in the 19th arrondissement of Paris
Railway stations in France opened in 1942

Paris Métro line 5